Shaba Games LLC was an American video game developer founded in September 1997. It was located in San Francisco, California. Initially it was a nine-person development team, with the founders having split off from Crystal Dynamics, more specifically from the team behind Pandemonium 2. It was acquired by Activision in 2002. Activision closed the studio on October 8, 2009.

Games developed

References

External links
 

Defunct Activision subsidiaries
Companies based in San Francisco
Video game companies established in 1997
Video game companies disestablished in 2009
2002 mergers and acquisitions
Former Vivendi subsidiaries
Defunct video game companies of the United States
Defunct companies based in the San Francisco Bay Area
1997 establishments in California
2009 disestablishments in California